Elongator complex protein 5 (ELP5) also known as dermal papilla-derived protein 6 (DERP6) is a protein that in humans is encoded by the ELP5 gene.

References

Further reading